Giorgia Ricca is an Italian curler.

At the national level, she is a three-time Italian mixed doubles champion curler (2011, 2013, 2014).

Teams and events

Women's

Mixed

Mixed doubles

References

External links

 
 

Living people
Italian female curlers
Italian curling champions
Year of birth missing (living people)
Place of birth missing (living people)